Rosie Méndez (born February 28, 1963) is an American politician who served in the New York City Council from the 2nd district from 2006 to 2017. She is a Democrat.

The district includes all or parts of Chelsea, the East Village, the Flatiron District, Gramercy, Greenwich Village, the Lower East Side, Midtown, Murray Hill, NoHo, and Stuyvesant Town in Manhattan.

Early life and education

Méndez grew up in the Williamsburg Houses, a New York City Housing Authority development. She is the child of Puerto Rican parents, and attended New York City public schools through high school. She graduated from New York University and Rutgers Law School. In 2011, Méndez completed Harvard University's John F. Kennedy School of Government] program for Senior Executives in State and Local Government as a David Bohnett Leadership Fellow.

Career

She began as a tenant organizer in Williamsburg, Brooklyn. She then worked on citywide housing issues as a housing specialist at the Parodneck Foundation. In 1995, Méndez graduated from law school and worked as an IOLA Legal Services Fellow at Brooklyn Legal Services. As a legal staff worker she became a member of the United Auto Workers (UAW).

Prior to her election to the Council, Méndez was the Democratic District Leader for her community for four terms. She served for three years as the Chief of Staff and Legislative Aide to her predecessor City Councilwoman Margarita Lopez.

New York City Council

In 2005, Méndez won the heavily contested Democratic primary for New York City's 2nd City Council district. In the heavily Democratic district, the primary victory was considered tantamount to election. After a landslide victory in the general election in November 2005, Méndez took office as the 2nd district's councilwoman in January 2006. She was re-elected in 2009 and 2013.

Animal rights
In June 2006, Méndez announced legislation to ban the use of wild animals in circuses. The bill received substantial support from other Council Members, including future Mayor Bill de Blasio, future Council Speaker Melissa Mark-Viverito, future Public Advocate Leticia James and future Manhattan Borough President Gale Brewer. Méndez, at a rally that year organized by the League of Humane Voters of New York City, told the media "We cannot say we’re an enlightened society when we allow animals to be tortured and abused for entertainment purposes." Though the bill had 25 co-sponsors, Council Speaker Christine Quinn strongly opposed the legislation and the bill died at the end of session. Méndez reintroduced the bill again in 2010 and then again in 2016. In June 2017, the bill was voted out of the Health Committee unanimously. On June 21, 2017, the Council passed Méndez's bill by a vote of 43-6. From the floor of the Council, Méndez thanked her "friend and constituent" John Phillips, who led the campaign to pass the bill and who brought the issue to her attention in 2006.

Election history

Personal life
Méndez is openly lesbian and was the Chairperson of the New York City Council's LGBT Caucus.

See also
 LGBT culture in New York City
 List of LGBT people from New York City
 Nuyorican
 Puerto Ricans in New York City

References

External links
 
 
 Information on the 2005 primary campaign in District 2

New York City Council members
Hispanic and Latino American New York City Council members
New York (state) Democrats
American politicians of Puerto Rican descent
Hispanic and Latino American city council members
Puerto Rican people in New York (state) politics
Activists from New York City
Hispanic and Latino American women in politics
Lesbian politicians
American LGBT city council members
American LGBT rights activists
LGBT people from New York (state)
1963 births
Living people
New York University alumni
Rutgers School of Law–Newark alumni
Women New York City Council members
21st-century American politicians
21st-century American women politicians
People from Williamsburg, Brooklyn
LGBT Hispanic and Latino American people